Poro may refer to:
 Operation Poro, a planned Soviet invasion of the Scandinavian peninsula in the 1930s
 Poro, a secret society of Sierra Leone and Liberia
 Poro, Cebu, a municipality in the Philippines
 Poro (opera), an opera seria by George Frideric Handel
 Poro Island, an island in the Philippines
 Poro Point, a headland in the Philippines
 Poro Region, a region in Ivory Coast, in Savanes District
 Poro, a fictional creature from the video game League of Legends
 PoRO (studio), a Japanese animation studio for hentai